Noonops is a genus of spiders in the family Oonopidae. It was first described in 2013 by Platnick & Berniker. , it contains 23 species from the U.S., Mexico, and the Bahamas.

Species

Noonops comprises the following species:
Noonops beattyi Platnick & Berniker, 2013
Noonops californicus Platnick & Berniker, 2013
Noonops chapul Platnick & Berniker, 2013
Noonops chilapensis (Chamberlin & Ivie, 1936)
Noonops coachella Platnick & Berniker, 2013
Noonops culiacan Platnick & Berniker, 2013
Noonops floridanus (Chamberlin & Ivie, 1935)
Noonops furtivus (Gertsch, 1936)
Noonops iviei Platnick & Berniker, 2013
Noonops joshua Platnick & Berniker, 2013
Noonops mesa Platnick & Berniker, 2013
Noonops minutus Platnick & Berniker, 2013
Noonops miraflores Platnick & Berniker, 2013
Noonops mortero Platnick & Berniker, 2013
Noonops naci Platnick & Berniker, 2013
Noonops ocotillo Platnick & Berniker, 2013
Noonops puebla (Gertsch & Davis, 1942)
Noonops skinner Platnick & Berniker, 2013
Noonops sonora (Gertsch & Davis, 1942)
Noonops tarantula Platnick & Berniker, 2013
Noonops taxquillo Platnick & Berniker, 2013
Noonops tonila Platnick & Berniker, 2013
Noonops willisi Platnick & Berniker, 2013

References

Oonopidae
Araneomorphae genera
Spiders of North America